The discography of T.S.O.L., an American punk rock band, consists of eleven studio albums, three live albums, three compilation albums, two EPs, two video albums, three singles, and five music videos.

T.S.O.L. (True Sounds of Liberty) formed in Huntington Beach, California in 1978 with an initial lineup of singer Jack Grisham, guitarist Ron Emory, bassist Mike Roche, and drummer Todd Barnes. Their eponymously titled debut EP was released in 1981 through Posh Boy Records and followed later that year by the full-length album Dance with Me through Frontier Records, combining hardcore punk and gothic rock styles. The Weathered Statues EP (1982) and Beneath the Shadows album (1983) followed via Alternative Tentacles, the latter adding keyboardist Greg Kuehn to the lineup. Grisham and Barnes left the band in late 1983 and were respectively replaced by Joe Wood and Mitch Dean, while Keuhn left and was not replaced.

The new lineup signed to Enigma Records and released Change Today? (1984) which began the launch of a ten year run with Wood and Dean (who at times still play under the banner today). 1986's Revenge was another stylistic shift, this time towards hard rock. Hit and Run (1987) found them adopting a  straight ahead rock sound and this  was their only album to chart, reaching no. 184 on the Billboard 200. It was followed by the compilation album Thoughts of Yesterday: 1981–1982 (1987) and live album Live (1988). Emory then left the band and was eventually replaced by Marshall Rohner; This lineup released 1990's Strange Love. Roche then was quit and sold his rights to the name to Wood and Dean as did Emory later on leaving the band with no remaining original members. The compilation Hell and Back Together: 1984–1990 was released in 1992.

Meanwhile, the original T.S.O.L. lineup of Grisham, Emory, Roche, and Barnes re-formed and released Live '91. In the wake of the 1990s punk rock revival, Epitaph Records re-released Dance with Me in 1996 and Nitro Records re-released the T.S.O.L. and Weathered Statues EPs as a single compilation. In 1999 the original members regained legal rights to the band's name from Joe Wood, though Barnes died of a brain aneurysm that December and was replaced by Jay O'Brien. T.S.O.L. signed to Nitro, who reissued Beneath the Shadows. A new studio album, Disappear, was released in 2001 and found the band returning to their hardcore punk roots. Live from O.C., a video album recorded in 1991, was released in 2002. O'Brien was replaced by Billy Blaze for 2003's Divided We Stand, which also featured the return of keyboardist Greg Kuehn. In 2005, with new drummer Anthony "Tiny" Buisu, the band released the video album Live in Hawaii and the retrospective album Who's Screwin' Who?, the latter consisting of songs from T.S.O.L., Dance with Me, Weathered Statues, Beneath the Shadows, Disappear, and Divided We Stand re-recorded by the 2005 lineup (originally released through Anarchy Music, it was later re-released by Cleopatra Records under the titles F#*k You Tough Guy: The Collection and Code Blue). T.S.O.L. went on hiatus in 2006, and Nitro reissued Dance with Me the following year.

The hiatus was short, as T.S.O.L. began performing again in 2007. 2008 brought The Early Years Live video and the live album Live from Long Beach, recorded at their next to last show before the hiatus and released through Cider City Records. The band's tenth studio album, Life, Liberty & the Pursuit of Free Downloads, was released in 2009; It was given away as a free music download through a sponsorship from Hurley International. T.S.O.L.'s most recent studio album, The Trigger Complex, was released in January 2017 through Rise Records, with Buisu replaced by new drummer Chip Hanna. The Current Drummer of T.S.O.L. (2017-present) is Antonio Val Hernandez.

Studio albums

I Who's Screwin' Who? was re-released by Cleopatra Records in 2008 as F#*k You Tough Guy: The Collection and in 2011 as Code Blue.

Live albums

Compilation albums

Extended plays

Video albums

Singles

Music videos

Other appearances 
The following T.S.O.L. songs were released on compilation albums. This is not an exhaustive list; songs that were first released on the band's albums, EPs, or singles are not included.

References

Punk rock group discographies
Discographies of American artists